John Philip "Bakkies" Botha, (born 22 September 1979) is a South African former professional rugby union player who played as a lock for the Springboks until 2014. He was a member of the national team that won the 2007 Rugby World Cup in France in addition to winning two Tri Nations titles in the 2004 Tri Nations Series and the 2009 Tri Nations Series. Botha plays for RC Toulonnais in the Top 14 after signing from Blue Bulls provincial team in the Currie Cup competition and the Bulls Super Rugby team. Botha was also a member of the Toulon squad which won the 2013, 2014 and 2015 Heineken Cup/European Rugby Champions Cup Finals. Botha became widely associated with fellow international lock Victor Matfield for their highly successful onfield partnership with the Springboks.

Career
Botha played for the under-19 and under-23 Springbok sides before being chosen for the South African "A" team that toured Europe at the end of 2001. The following year he was selected for the Springbok team and made his debut against France in Marseille on 9 September 2002, a game the Springboks went on to lose 30–10.

Through the years Botha and Blue Bulls teammate Victor Matfield formed a formidable partnership at lock for both their province and country. Botha is known as one of the "hardest" locks in world rugby, and is nicknamed "The Enforcer" for his physical play.

His confrontational style has resulted in a number of controversial incidents. He received a yellow card for stamping in his debut against France. Then in August 2003 he was accused of biting and then eye-gouging Wallabies hooker Brendan Cannon, and although there was insufficient video evidence to consider the biting charge, and he was found not guilty of gouging, he was still suspended for eight weeks for "attacking the face". Cannon has given interviews stating that Botha both bit and gouged him, and Botha himself gave an interview to The Times saying that his ban was "for an eye-gouge".

In April 2009 he received a three-match ban for striking Phil Waugh in a 2009 Super 14 season match,

In June 2009 whilst playing for South Africa in the second test against the British & Irish Lions, Botha was banned for two weeks for a dangerous charge on the Lions prop Adam Jones in a ruck which left the Welsh player with a dislocated shoulder requiring surgery. Botha's appeal against the ban was dismissed, and he missed the third test against the Lions. The injured Jones himself later came out in defence of Botha, saying:
"Botha shouldn't have been banned for it, nowhere near it. I don't have any complaints. He just cleared me out of the ruck and I got caught. Everyone counter-rucks nowadays and, if anything, I was in the wrong place. He just hit me and I was unlucky. So I was surprised to see he got banned. I know we didn't cite him so I don't know why the independent commissioner did. It was just a fair ruck from a hard player. When I have met him before he seems like a tidy enough bloke so I'm not seeing it as anything malicious."
In a controversial move, the whole South African team wore armbands with 'Justice 4' (a reference to Botha's shirt number) written on them in the third and final test against the Lions, in support of Botha and in protest over perceived inconsistencies in the citing process, for which the South African Rugby Union was charged with bringing the game into disrepute by the IRB.

In May 2010, during the Bulls Super 14 game against the Stormers, Botha was suspended for four weeks following a dangerous clearout of wing Gio Aplon. This was Botha's first match as captain of the Bulls. The suspension meant Botha missed the playoffs.

On 10 July 2010, in the 1st test of the 2010 Tri Nations Series against New Zealand, Botha was suspended from all rugby for 9 weeks by an IRB judiciary for head-butting All Black halfback Jimmy Cowan, ruling him out of the remainder of the 2010 Tri Nations Series.

Botha played in three winning Currie Cup finals with the Bulls ('02, '04 & '09), and was also a member of the victorious Bulls team in the Super 14 in the 2007 Super 14 season, 2009 Super 14 season and 2010 Super 14 season. He also won the Heineken Cup/European Rugby Champions Cup with Toulon in 2013, 2014 and 2015. He is now one of the most decorated players in world rugby.

Appraisal
Botha's record of winning rugby sides is hard to match.

Whilst known as a very hard player, his disciplinary record was actually not unusual.

Botha is regularly listed in 'greatest ever' sides, and coach Bernard Laporte said he was the greatest player he ever coached.

Honours
Nominee for SA player of the year in 2003, 2004 and 2005.

Voted by the French publication Midi Olympique in 2013 as the best No. 4 lock to ever play the game. At the time, he was one of only two players in the best XV still playing, the other being Richie McCaw.

The only player in the history of rugby union to date to have won a hat trick of Super Rugby and European rugby titles.

 Blue Bulls 
Vodacom Cup: 2001
Currie Cup: 2002, 2004, 2006 (draw), 2009

Bulls
Super Rugby: 2007, 2009, 2010

Toulon
Heineken Cup European Champions/European Rugby Champions Cup: 2013, 2014, 2015
Top 14 French League : 2014

South Africa
World Cup: 2007
Tri-Nations: 2004, 2009
British & Irish Lions series win: 2009
Mandela Challenge Plate: 2005, 2009
Freedom Cup: 2004, 2009
Prince William Cup: 2007, 2008, 2010

Activities in retirement
As of 2019 Botha runs a butchery business in South Africa called "Bakkies the Butcher".

References

External links

Bakkies Botha at Springbok Rugby Hall of Fame

1979 births
Living people
Afrikaner people
Barbarian F.C. players
Blue Bulls players
Bulls (rugby union) players
Expatriate rugby union players in France
RC Toulonnais players
Rugby union locks
Rugby union players from Newcastle, KwaZulu-Natal
South Africa international rugby union players
South African expatriate rugby union players
South African expatriate sportspeople in France
South African rugby union players